Bettie Sue Shumway (March 14, 1924–January 19, 2007) was an American politician who served for one term as a Democratic member of the Kansas House of Representatives, from 1989 to 1990.

Shumway was born in Tyronza, Arkansas and grew up in Louisiana, graduating from Louisiana Tech University. She worked as a music teacher and kindergarten teacher in public schools. She moved to Kansas with her husband in 1961 and continued teaching; she was elected to the state House in 1988, and was the office-mate of future governor Kathleen Sebelius during her time in the Capitol.

References

External Links
 Oral history project interview with Shumway 

1924 births
2007 deaths
Democratic Party members of the Kansas House of Representatives
People from Ottawa, Kansas
20th-century American politicians
20th-century American women politicians
Women state legislators in Kansas
Louisiana Tech University alumni